E. pentaphylla may refer to:

 Ephielis pentaphylla, an evergreen endemic to New Zealand
 Esenbeckia pentaphylla, a flowering plant